is a Japanese former professional baseball infielder in Nippon Professional Baseball. He played for the Chunichi Dragons from 1977 to 1992 and the Chiba Lotte Marines from 1993 to 1994.

References

1958 births
Living people
Baseball people from Chiba Prefecture
Nippon Professional Baseball infielders
Japanese baseball players
Chunichi Dragons players
Chiba Lotte Marines players
Japanese baseball coaches